Julio Eduardo Santa Cruz Cantero (born 12 May 1990) is a Paraguayan footballer forward who last played for General Díaz in the Primera División Paraguaya. Santa Cruz is most notable for scoring during the first–leg of the 2014 Copa Libertadores Finals. He is also the brother of Roque Santa Cruz.

Club career

Cerro Porteño
In August 2006, Santa Cruz was part of Cerro Porteño's U16 squad in a notable victory against Olimpia Asunción U16. Santa Cruz was a member of the club's first-team for the 2008 season, also with several other youth team graduates as Rodrigo Burgos, Celso Ortiz, Ivan Piris and Luis Caceres.

Blackburn Rovers

2008–2011
On 6 August 2008, the BBC reported that Blackburn Rovers had signed Santa Cruz. He joined the club on a three year deal from Primera División Paraguaya team Cerro Porteño. Santa Cruz had been on trial at Ewood Park since the end of the 2007–08 season and over the summer, and it was likely that he would join the reserve-team. On signing with the club, Santa Cruz commented "I'm happy to be here at Blackburn, it will be an amazing adventure for me".

Manager Paul Ince had completed the deal for Santa Cruz for the 2008–09 season where which he would play alongside his brother and the transfer was subject to international clearance.

Upon his arrival at the club in 2008, Santa Cruz made 11 league appearances for Blackburn's reserve-team until his departure in 2011.

Speculation was made by his father and manager, Aproniano, that he could return to Paraguayan football for the 2011 season. Santa Cruz regularly appeared for the reserve squad but was yet to receive a first-team contract. His father explained to ABC Color that the priority was to keep Santa Cruz in Europe but would not rule out the option of Santa Cruz returning to a Paraguayan club that played in the Copa Libertadores or Copa Sudamericana, CONMEBOL's continental competitions, and that the club could be Cerro Porteño.

In December 2010, Olimpia Asunción president Marcelo Recanate indicated that he wanted Julio Santa Cruz, and had spoken with his elder brother so that he could sign Julio for the 2011 season.

Olimpia

2012 season
Santa Cruz debuted for Olimpia in a 0–0 draw against Tacuary on 16 June 2012. Santa Cruz was substituted onto the field for Maxi Biancucchi in the 87th minute.

Nacional Asunción
Santa Cruz made his first appearance in all competitions for Nacional during the 2014 Copa Libertadores. Santa Cruz, who had been issued the number #29 for the 2014 season, was substituted onto the field in the 89th minute for Julián Benítez in a 3–1 away group stage defeat against Colombia's Independiente Santa Fe on 11 February 2014.

On 16 February 2014, Santa Cruz made his first and full league debut for Nacional in the 2014 Paraguayan Primera División season, playing a full 90 minutes of a 3–0 home victory against Sportivo Luqueño.

Four days later, Santa Cruz featured as a second-half substitute in Nacional's second Copa Libertadores group stage fixture, a 1–0 home victory against Venezuela club Zamora on 20 February 2014.

His first goal for Nacional came in the 71st minute of a 2–1 home victory against Sol de America on 31 March 2014. The ball had been crossed toward Santa Cruz inside the 18-yard box area who headed the ball across the face of goal into the net to win the match for Nacional.

Santa Cruz scored his second league goal for Nacional in a 4–0 away victory against Club Guaraní 26 April 2014. Santa Cruz had converted a penalty kick from the spot in the 70th minute.

On 6 August 2014, Santa Cruz was substituted onto the field in the 70th minute for Derlis Orué during the first–leg of the 2014 Copa Libertadores Finals against Argentina's San Lorenzo and scored a last-gasp equalizer in the 93rd minute of the match to make the score line 1–1. A long ball had been played in the air from the mid-field and flicked on with the head of striker Fredy Bareiro, toward the front of the right side of the goal posts, as Santa Cruz managed to convert the goal from a tight angle with a right foot shot towards the top of the net. Santa Cruz later stated that the goal was the most important one of his career and that after the match he received a message of congratulations from older brother Roque. During the second–leg on 13 August, Santa Cruz was substituted onto the field in the 85th minute of the match for Julián Benítez as Nacional were ultimately defeated 1–0.

Santa Cruz would not score again until 24 September, scoring the second goal in a 2–1 home victory against Sportivo Luqueño. He had been substituted onto the field in the 23rd minute of the first half for Armando De Giacomi, and scored in the 45th minute to give Nacional a 2–0 lead at half-time. Two weeks later, Santa Cruz scored his fourth league goal of the 2014 season against former side Deportivo Capiatá on 5 October. Santa Cruz, who was in the starting eleven of the fixture, scored in the 43rd minute to give Nacional a 1–0 lead as they went on to claim a 3–2 away victory.

Career statistics

Honours

Club
Olimpia Asunción
 Paraguayan Primera División:
 Winner: 2011 Clasura
 Runner-up: 2011 Apertura, 2012 Apertura

Nacional Asunción
 Copa Libertadores:
 Runners-up (1) 2014

Personal life
Julio Santa Cruz is the younger brother of Roque Santa Cruz, Diego Santa Cruz, and the late Oscar Santa Cruz. His father, Aproniano, manages both Julio and Roque.

References

External links
 

1990 births
Living people
Paraguayan footballers
Paraguayan expatriate footballers
Paraguayan Primera División players
Club Olimpia footballers
Deportivo Capiatá players
Club Nacional footballers
Sportivo Trinidense footballers
General Díaz footballers
Esporte Clube Pelotas players
Sportspeople from Asunción
Association football forwards
Expatriate footballers in England
Expatriate footballers in Brazil
Paraguayan expatriate sportspeople in England
Paraguayan expatriate sportspeople in Brazil